Pagyesa, or Pagye Temple, is a Buddhist temple in Palgongsan mountain park, near Daegu, South Korea. The temple was first built in 804 by a priest named Simji, and was restored and expanded in the 17th century.

References

Buddhist temples in South Korea
Korean culture